Mazha is a 2000 Indian Malayalam-language drama film written and directed by Lenin Rajendran based on the short story Nashtappetta Neelambari by Madhavikkutty. It stars Biju Menon, Samyuktha Varma and Lal. The music was composed by Ravindran. The film won five Kerala State Film Awards, a National Film Award and a South Filmfare Award.

Plot
Mazha tells the love story of Bhadra (Samyuktha Varma) and her music teacher Sastrigal (Biju Menon). The film begins with teenager Bhadra coming to learn music under Sastrigal and getting infatuated with him and his singing in Sivapuram. The story describes the teenager Bhadra's characters and behavior in a nice mood. At her teenage time the madhura is a beautiful village having a lot of Tamil Brahmins, the shasthrikal is also one of them. Bhadhra falls in love with her music teacher (shasthrikal)  because of her teenage nature and curiosity towards his music.

The story runs in the surroundings of the famous Meenakshi Amman Temple in Tamil Nadu.  Bhadra's creative talents for poetry start to flourish, under his influence. Sastrigal is not much aware of Bhadra's love and considers her only as his talented student. Coming to know about Bhadra's infatuation, her parents took her with them and Sastrigal is obliged to marry his fiancée(Sindhu).

Bhadra becomes a doctor (like her father) and is married to Chandran (Lal) who is a computer engineer. Chandran happens to see her diary one day and the relationship goes for a toss. Of course, there are no names in the diary. So he goes off to doubt every male in her life – including the elderly senior doctor Thilakan. He becomes a victim to his drinking and dies of related illness.

In the end, Bhadra sets out in search of Sastrigal to Madurai where she discovers that Sastrigal also has lost much – his wife is a mental patient and the final shock is when she finds out that Sastrigal has lost his beautiful voice due to cancer.

Cast
 Biju Menon as Ramanuja Sastrigal
 Samyuktha Varma as Dr. Bhadra Nair 
 Lal as Chandran
 Sindhu Shyam as Jnanam 
 Thilakan as Dr.
Devi Ajith as Gayathri
 Urmila Unni as Saraswathy Madhavan Nair
Jagathy Sreekumar as vaikunda  Shastrikal

Soundtrack 
The film's soundtrack contains 9 songs, all composed by Ravindran. Lyrics were by Bharathiyar, Kaithapram Damodaran Namboothiri, O. V. Usha, Yusuf Ali Kecheri and K. Jayakumar.

Reception

Despite positive reviews, the film was a commercial failure.

According to Arun of The Indian Express, "it's due to the phenomenal success of Narasimham. Its massive success cast a gigantic shadow that devoured the entire Malayalam film industry. Well almost "The Narasimham hangover is terrifically strong and it has, at least for the moment, killed the prospects of good films. I don't see any other reason for the failure of well made female-oriented films like Mazha and Madhuranombarakkattu."

Awards

National Film Awards
 Best Lyricist: Yusufali Kechery
Kerala State Film Awards
 Best Actress: Samyuktha Varma
 Best Lyrics: O. V. Usha
 Best Background Score: Biju Paulose
 Best Singer: Asha G. Menon
 Best Sound Recordist: N. Hari Kumar
Asianet Film Awards
 Best Actress  : Samyuktha Varma
 Best Lyrics   : O V Usha & Jayakumar
 Music Direction : Raveendran
 Best Female Playback Singer : K S Chithra
 Voice of the year : Asha G Menon
 Best Supporting Actor : Biju Menon
Filmfare Awards South
 Best Malayalam Actress : Samyuktha Varma

References

External links
 

2000 films
2000s Malayalam-language films
2000s romantic musical films
2000s musical drama films
Indian romantic musical films
Films scored by Raveendran
Indian musical drama films
Films directed by Lenin Rajendran